Great Eastern Hotel may refer to:
 Great Eastern Hotel (Kolkata)
 Great Eastern Hotel, London